Hymera is a town in and the principal center of Jackson Township, Sullivan County, in the U.S. state of Indiana. The population was 801 at the 2010 census.

Geography
It is part of the Terre Haute Metropolitan Statistical Area. The primary coordinate point for Hymera is located at latitude 39.1859 and longitude -87.2989 in Sullivan County. Sullivan County is in the Eastern time zone (GMT -5). The elevation is 525 feet.

Demographics

2010 census
As of the census of 2010, there were 801 people, 306 households, and 215 families residing in the town. The racial makeup of the town was 99.0% White, 0.2% Native American, and 0.7% from two or more races. Hispanic or Latino of any race were 0.1% of the population.

There were 306 households, of which 36.9% had children under the age of 18 living with them, 48.4% were married couples living together, 15.0% had a female householder with no husband present, 6.9% had a male householder with no wife present, and 29.7% were non-families. 26.1% of all households were made up of individuals, and 11.4% had someone living alone who was 65 years of age or older. The average household size was 2.62 and the average family size was 3.14.

The median age in the town was 37.5 years. 28% of residents were under the age of 18; 6.1% were between the ages of 18 and 24; 25.8% were from 25 to 44; 27.3% were from 45 to 64; and 12.7% were 65 years of age or older. The gender makeup of the town was 49.7% male and 50.3% female.

2000 census
As of the census of 2000, there were 833 people, 331 households, and 228 families residing in the town. The racial makeup of the town was 99.40% White, 0.24% Native American, and 0.36% from two or more races.

There were 331 households, out of which 29.3% had children under the age of 18 living with them, 55.6% were married couples living together, 10.3% had a female householder with no husband present, and 31.1% were non-families. 24.8% of all households were made up of individuals, and 16.0% had someone living alone who was 65 years of age or older. The average household size was 2.52 and the average family size was 3.02.

In the town, the population was spread out, with 25.3% under the age of 18, 11.0% from 18 to 24, 27.6% from 25 to 44, 22.8% from 45 to 64, and 13.2% who were 65 years of age or older. The median age was 35 years. For every 100 females, there were 101.2 males. For every 100 females age 18 and over, there were 93.8 males.

The median income for a household in the town was $28,938, and the median income for a family was $34,091. Males had a median income of $28,850 versus $16,369 for females. The per capita income for the town was $13,113. About 13.7% of families and 17.2% of the population were below the poverty line, including 19.4% of those under age 18 and 15.2% of those age 65 or over.

Schools
Students from Hymera attend Northeast East Elementary (grades K-6), and North Central High School (grades 7-12) located in Farmersburg, Indiana.

Local attractions
The primary local attractions are Shakamak State Park, Bruce's Pizza & Bait Shop, and the Minnehaha Fish and Wildlife Area.

History

During pioneer times, the area was settled by the Methodists for the Bethel Church. A log building once stood within the limits of the present town, where the early settlers assembled for religious worship. On Busseron Creek was a grist mill erected about 1829. On the westside was one of the first coal mines of the county; it was owned by H. K. and Harvey Wilson. The coal was used chiefly by local blacksmiths.

Hymera was platted as a townsite circa 1870.

Robert Linn had a general store on the site now occupied by the Odd Fellows block. For some years the store and post office, and two or three shops, comprised the business of the place.

When the post office was established the name Pittsburg was selected by the local community, in honor of William Pitt who owned the land on which Hymera was founded. However, the name was not accepted by the postal department. The post office was then established under the name Hymera, and has been in operation since 1855.

The origin of the name Hymera is credited to John Badders, who was postmaster. He had an adopted daughter, Mary.

The change of name for the village was accomplished in 1890. In April of that year, a petition from nearly all the voters of Pittsburg was laid before the county commissioners asking that the name of the town as recorded on the plat be changed to Hymera. A short time previously, on the opening of the new mine at Alum Cave, the new town laid out there was called New Pittsburg, while the Hymera community in distinction was referred to as Old Pittsburg. The resulting confusion brought about the change in name. About this time a branch line of railroad reached up to the coal mines in the vicinity, which led to tremendous growth. In 1902 Hymera was incorporated into a town. That July, the first election for town officers was held.

One of the memorable days in the history of Hymera was the celebration in October 1904, known as Mitchell Day, in honor of John Mitchell, the president of the United Mine Workers of America. The crowd in town was estimated at over seven-thousand. A delegation met Mitchell at Terre Haute, and the local procession was made up of the K. of P. Band, labor organizations, and school children. The ceremonies of the day centered about the unveiling of a monument to Nathan Hinkle, the Revolutionary soldier who was buried in the Hymera Cemetery. Hon. James S. Barcus, a great-grandson of Hinkle, delivered an address, and Miss Mamie Asbury, a great-granddaughter, assisted in the unveiling. The monument is fifteen feet high, representing a Revolutionary soldier at parade rest. The other events of the day were held in the Zink Grove, where speeches were made by Rev. A. P. Asbury and Robert W. Miers and John C. Chaney, and the principal address of the afternoon was delivered by Mitchell himself.

In the fall of 1905, Mitchell was reported to have said that Hymera was the neatest mining town in the United States, with more and better sidewalks according to its size than any town in the county, and many improvements indicating a progressive spirit among the citizens.

At the time, there were five church organization, the Methodist, Baptist, Presbyterian, United Brethren and Christian, the first two having good buildings, while the Presbyterians and U. B. were preparing to build. A five-room school building had proved inadequate, and a four-room addition was added in the summer of 1905. The Hymera State Bank, which had been organized in December 1903, as the Bank of Hymera, by S. M. Patton and R. I. Ladd, was reorganized as a state bank in January 1906, with Mr. Ladd as President and Mr. Patton, Cashier.

References

External links
Hymera Elementary school
North Central Jr/Sr High School
Nathan Hinkle

Towns in Sullivan County, Indiana
Towns in Indiana
Terre Haute metropolitan area